The 1935 Sugar Bowl was the first Sugar Bowl game.  Tulane (9–1) hosted unbeaten Temple (7–0–2) before a crowd of 22,206 in New Orleans. Temple took a 14–0 lead before Tulane came back to win the game, 20–14. The game was played at Tulane's home field, so it was technically a home game for the Green Wave. Temple had been ranked 15th in a November 15, 1934, AP football poll.

The Mid-Winter Sports Association of New Orleans was formed in 1934 to formulate plans for an annual New Year’s Day football classic. On December 2, 1934, the Association’s executive board selected Tulane and unbeaten Temple to play in the first game. Columbia and Colgate were also considered by the Association to represent the east.

The most notable play of the game came in the second quarter when Tulane's quarterback John McDaniel caught a Temple kickoff, ran to the right to draw tacklers, then threw a lateral pass to his teammate Monk Simons who ran 75 yards for the touchdown. Two more Tulane touchdowns in the second half outweighed Temple's early lead.

References

Sugar Bowl
Sugar Bowl
Temple Owls football bowl games
Tulane Green Wave football bowl games
Sugar Bowl
Sugar Bowl